This is the discography of Mondo Rock, an Australian pop rock band that formed in November 1976. The group released six studio albums until their split in 1991. In that time, the group had ten top 40 singles and was one of the most popular acts in Australia during the early 1980s.

Albums

Studio albums

Live albums

Compilation albums

Extended plays

Singles

References

Discographies of Australian artists
Rock music group discographies
Pop music group discographies